The University of Hargeisa (abbreviated UoH) is a public university located in Hargeisa, the capital of Somaliland. The institution was founded in 1998. It is the leading and largest higher education institution in the country and provides a wide range of undergraduate and postgraduate courses in different fields.

History 
The institution was founded in 1998 by Fawzia Yusuf H. Adam.

Since its establishment, the university has collaborated with many academic and international partners in different capacities, including UCL, King's College, Harvard University, UCSI, International University of Africa, and other local universities in the horn of Africa.

Leadership 
The current president of the university is Dr. Mohamud Yousuf Muse, who holds a Ph.D. in Education from the International Islamic University in Malaysia. The university had previously been led by some of the other well-known Somali scholars, including Professor Hussein A. Bulhan, a graduate of Harvard University.

Students 
The university has over 7,000 students and operates on a four to six years system.

Notable alumni 
Notable alumni include the current president of Somaliland Muse Bihi Abdi and the first National Deputy Prosecutor in Somaliland Khadra Hussein Mohammad.

The university has also an annual honorary doctorate award to outstanding members of society, the first of which was awarded to Abdi Waraabe.

Schools and colleges 
The university consists of 14 different colleges, schools and institutes, which offer different undergraduate and postgraduate programs:

 College of Agri & Veterinary Medicine
 College of Applied & Natural Science
 College of Business & Public Administration
 College of Education
 College of Engineering
 College of Computing & IT
 College of Law
 College of Medicine & Health Science
 College of Social Science & Humanities
 College of Islamic Studies & Arabic Language
 Hargeisa School of Economics
 School of Graduate Studies
 Institute for Peace & Conflict Studies
 Gaariye Institute of Somali Studies and Literature Studies

Postgraduate programs
The university offers postgraduate programs, including postgraduate diploma and master's, in the following areas:

Institute for Peace & Conflict Studies 
The Institute for Peace and Conflict Studies (IPCS) was established in February 2008.

Graduates include Abdirahman Aw Ali Farrah, former vice president of Somaliland; Musa Bihi Abdi, current president of the Republic of Somaliland and chairman of the ruling party Kulmiye; and Abdirahman Mohamed Abdilahi, former speaker of the Somaliland House of Representatives and the chairman of Waddani Party.

The IPCS offers two locally reputable master's degrees: a Master of Arts in Peace and Conflict Studies and a Master of Arts in Education, Conflict & Peace Building.

College of Medicine & Health Science 
The College of Medicine & Health Science is part of the university.

Teaching staff 
The university has a wide number of academics in all its faculties. Around 60 percent of the staff were PhD and master's holders in the academic year 2017/2018.

References

External links
Official website 

Universities in Somaliland
University of Hargeisa
Educational institutions established in 2000
2000 establishments in Somaliland